You Can't Really Miss Me If I Never Go Away is the first EP by Donnie Iris, released in 2008.

Track listing 
 "Hard Spot" (Avsec)
 "I Can't Really Miss You (If You Never Go Away)" (Avsec)
 "Ode to Jane (Immortal Beloved)" (Avsec)
 "Screamin' Boy" demo (Avsec)
 "The Twelve Dawnie Days of Christmas" live (Avsec)

Personnel 
 Donnie Iris - lead and background vocals
 Mark Avsec - keyboards
 Marty Lee Hoenes - guitars
 Alan Green - guitar (#4)
 Paul Goll - bass (#1)
 Albritton McClain - bass (#2 & 3)
 Kevin Valentine - drums (#2 & 3)
 Brice Foster - drums (#1)
 Tommy Rich - drums (#4)

References 

Donnie Iris albums
2008 EPs
Albums produced by Mark Avsec